Crosslands is a hamlet in the South Lakeland district of Cumbria, England. It is located just to the northeast of Rusland in the civil parish of Colton.

References

Hamlets in Cumbria
Colton, Cumbria